Matthew Dean Dodge (born May 30, 1987) is a former American football punter. He was drafted by the New York Giants in the seventh round of the 2010 NFL Draft.

Early life and college career
Dodge was born in Morehead City, North Carolina, where he played multiple sports including football and soccer at West Carteret High School before attending Appalachian State University. He also dabbled in bodybuilding.

As a freshman at Appalachian State, Dodge was the punter for the 2005 NCAA Division I-AA National Championship-winning team. He later transferred to East Carolina University and become their punter for the 2007, 2008 and 2009 seasons. As a senior, he was named Second-team All-American after ranking second in the NCAA in yards per punt (45.8).

Professional career

Pre-draft
Dodge was projected to be drafted in the seventh round or signed as an undrafted free agent prior to the 2010 NFL Draft.

New York Giants
Dodge was drafted by the New York Giants in the seventh round (221st overall) of the 2010 NFL Draft to replace long-time Giants punter Jeff Feagles, who had just retired. Dodge beat out Jy Bond for the punting job on June 21 when Bond was waived from the team. Dodge was signed to a four-year contract on June 23.

Dodge's first professional punt was blocked in a Monday night preseason game against the New York Jets. During a game against the Philadelphia Eagles on December 19, 2010, Dodge had a 36-yard punt that was returned by DeSean Jackson for a touchdown as time expired, giving the Eagles a 38−31 win in a game later called "The Punt" by Giants fans and "The Miracle at the New Meadowlands" by Eagles fans. Shortly after the winning touchdown, Dodge was publicly criticized by his head coach, Tom Coughlin, for failing to punt the ball out of bounds.

On September 3, 2011, Dodge was released from the Giants in favor of former New York Jet punter Steve Weatherford.

Dodge tried out with multiple NFL teams including the Chicago Bears until 2013, but did not receive a contract. Dodge recalled in 2016 that he "punted okay but they could tell that I wasn't sold out for it and they looked at me and were like, 'Matt, do you want to do this?' Like, they asked me straight up, 'Do you want to do this? Because you can't pretend.' At that time I was like, 'I really don't.' And it was a very freeing feeling. It released me from the grasp of the NFL machine as being the best part of my life."

Regular season

Personal life
Dodge married his wife Allison in July 2015.

During his NFL team tryouts, resumed bodybuilding and entered various competitions along with working as a personal trainer. He later became a wealth management consultant and author.

References

External links
New York Giants bio
East Carolina Pirates bio

1987 births
Living people
People from Morehead City, North Carolina
Players of American football from North Carolina
American football punters
Appalachian State Mountaineers football players
East Carolina Pirates football players
New York Giants players